Vincenzo Leonardo "Enzo" Cilenti (born 8 August 1974) is an English actor, known for his roles in works such as The Theory of Everything, Jonathan Strange & Mr Norrell, and Game of Thrones.

Early life
Cilenti was born in Bradford, West Yorkshire to Italian parents from Foiano di Val Fortore (in the province of Benevento). He worked with his girlfriend, actress Sienna Guillory,  in the 2001 film Late Night Shopping. The two were married in 2002, and they have continued to appear together in various works. In February 2011 Guillory gave birth to their twin daughters, Valentina and Lucia, named after Guillory's grandmother and great aunt, who were also twin sisters.

After attending Bradford Grammar School, a degree in French and Spanish at the University of Nottingham followed and led to him working as a night porter and a bodyguard on the Cote D'Azur and in Mexico City respectively.

Career
His first professional acting role came in Trial & Retribution, which led to the role of Grant in the world premiere of Liz Lochhead's Perfect Days at The Traverse Theatre, Edinburgh. Here he was spotted by Wendy Brazington who was casting Michael Winterbottom's Wonderland which at the time had the working title Snarl Up. He played graphic artist Peter Saville on his second collaboration with Winterbottom, the Palme d'Or-nominated 24 Hour Party People.

He has appeared in plays both on and off the West End, notably lead roles in Neil LaBute's The Shape of Things at The New Ambassadors Theatre, and the European premiere of the Pulitzer prize-winning play Anna in the Tropics at the Hampstead Theatre.

In 2007, Cilenti had a recurring role in the CBS series NCIS as terrorist Mamoun Sharif.

He also performed at The Royal Court in a series of plays written and directed by Russian artists entirely in Russian; in Thai ballet as Orpheus in Backpacker Orpheus, a play devised entirely from people's experiences in the 2004 Indian Ocean earthquake; and in conceptual theatre for new-writing company Paines Plough in a series of shows (including a one-man show) commissioned over a number of seasons by Miuccia Prada to showcase collections for her Miu Miu line at Milan Fashion Week.

Cilenti also directed a short film called Getalife, and in 2015 produced, wrote and appeared in his first feature-length movie The Wicked Within.

His first novel, Mediterranean Homesick Blues, co-written with Ben Chatfield, was published in 2012.

He appeared in Kick-Ass 2 (2013) and Guardians of the Galaxy (2014). In The Theory of Everything, he portrayed astrophysicist Kip Thorne.

In 2015 he joined the cast of the HBO series Game of Thrones in Season 5 as Yezzan zo Qaggaz,; he also appeared in the BBC series Jonathan Strange & Mr Norrell in the role of Childermass.

Cilenti played the part of Aubrey Hackett in the Amazon Studios series The Last Tycoon, which was released in July 2017.

In 2019 he played the role of Joe Lyppiatt (in a gender-swap for the character Joanna) in Noël Coward's Present Laughter at the Old Vic in London opposite Andrew Scott.

He lives in London and Los Angeles.

Partial filmography

 Wonderland (1999) - Darren
 Late Night Shopping (2001) - Lenny
 Fallen Dreams (2001) - Arthur
 24 Hour Party People (2002) - Peter Saville
 Legion of Honor (2002) - Sgt. Crepelli
 Spooks (2003, TV Series) - Carlo Franceschini (uncredited)
 Crust (2003) - Todd Higgins
 Millions (2004) - St Francis
 Colour Me Kubrick: A True... ish Story (2005) - Waldegrave
 Rome (2005, TV Series) - Evander Pulchio
 The Virgin Queen (2005, TV Mini-Series) - Jean de Simier
 Rabbit Fever (2006) - Andrew
 Next (2007) - Mr. Jones
 In the Loop (2009) - Bob Adriano
 The Fourth Kind (2009) - Scott Stracinsky
 Nine (2009) - Leopardi
 Lie to Me (2009, TV Series) - John Lightman
 The Rum Diary (2011) - Digby
 House (2012, TV Series) - Matt Johnson
 Prisoners' Wives (2013, TV Series) - Mick
 Kick-Ass 2 (2013) - Lou
 Supercollider (2013) - Leo Tarsky
 Guardians of the Galaxy (2014) - Watchtower Guard
 The Theory of Everything (2014) - Kip Thorne
 Wolf Hall (2015, TV Mini-Series) - Antonio Bonvisi
 Jonathan Strange & Mr Norrell (2015, TV Mini-Series) - Childermass
 The Martian (2015) - Mike Watkins
 High-Rise (2015) - Talbot
 The Man Who Knew Infinity (2015) - Doctor
 The Wicked Within (2015) - Michael
 Jekyll and Hyde (2015, TV Mini-Series) - Captain Dance
 Game of Thrones (2015–16, TV Series) - Yezzan zo Qaggaz
 Bridget Jones's Baby (2016) - Gianni
 Free Fire (2016) - Bernie
 Grantchester (2016, TV Series) - Felix Davis
 The Man with the Iron Heart (2016) - Adolf Opalka
 The Last Tycoon (2016–17, TV Series) - Aubrey Hackett
 Next of Kin (2018) - Barnesy
 Luther (2019, TV Series) - Jeremy Lake
 Les Misérables (2019, TV Mini-Series) - Rivette
 Greed (2019) - Eric Weeks
 Present Laughter (2019) - Joe Lyppiatt
 Domina (2021) - Nero
 The Serpent Queen (2022, TV series) - Cosimo Ruggeri

References

External links
 

1974 births
English expatriates in the United States
English male film actors
English people of Italian descent
English male television actors
Living people
Male actors from Bradford
People educated at Bradford Grammar School
Alumni of the University of Nottingham
Alumni of the Drama Studio London